The 1998 Kansas State Wildcats football team represented Kansas State University in the 1998 NCAA Division I-A football season.  The team's head football coach was Bill Snyder.  The Wildcats played their home games in KSU Stadium. 1998 saw the Wildcats finish with a record of 11–2, and an 8–0 record in Big 12 Conference play.

The Wildcats finished the regular season undefeated (11–0) and were ranked second in the nation ahead of their match-up with tenth-ranked Texas A&M in the 1998 Big 12 Championship Game. Kansas State lost in overtime, losing their chance at a national championship.

After the Big 12 Championship Game, Kansas State did not receive a spot in the inaugural Bowl Championship Series despite being ranked in its top four as well as the highest ranked non-champion from any conference. They also were not invited to the Cotton Bowl Classic in Dallas, as the conference runner-up typically would be, or the Holiday Bowl in San Diego, which at the time was contracted to invite the third place team in the conference; those bowls chose Texas and Nebraska instead. Instead, Kansas State was invited to the Alamo Bowl, where it lost to the unranked Purdue Boilermakers, who drove 80 yards for a touchdown in the final minute to defeat Kansas State 37–34.

Following the end of the season, a new rule was created. Nicknamed the "Kansas State Rule", the #3 ranked team would always have an automatic bid to a BCS bowl game.

The Wildcats finished the season as the top scoring team in NCAA Division I-A (at 48 points per game), and set a school record for points scored with 610.

Schedule

Roster

Game summaries

Indiana State

Northern Illinois

Texas

Kansas State welcomed Texas for their first Big 12 Conference matchup, and first meeting since 1942, and Texas' first trip to Manhattan since 1926.  1998 Heisman Trophy winner Ricky Williams was held to just 43 yards on 25 carries for an average of just 1.7 yards per carry.  He did not score in the game.  Williams averaged 202 rushing yards per game in 1998 and was held to a season low 43 yards, his next lowest yardage output was 90 yards against Oklahoma State.  K-State racked up 223 yards on the ground on 51 carries and the Wildcats won handily, 48–7.

Northeast Louisiana

at #14 Colorado

Kansas State beat Colorado for the second consecutive year (only their second win against the Buffaloes since 1984) and won their first game in Boulder since 1973.  K-State came to Boulder with a 2-24 all-time record in games played in Boulder. K-State came to Colorado beating the opposition by an average of 57 points a game, and had a defense which had allowed a total of 21 points in its first 4 games.  Colorado was a 17-point underdog and had only lost once in the last 13 seasons to the Wildcats.  Colorado held K-State, which was averaging 470 yards and 62 points coming into the game, to 332 yards and just 16 points. Colorado had just 225 yards of total offense, including 37 yards rushing on 31 attempts.

Oklahoma State

Iowa State

at Kansas

at Baylor

Nebraska

Michael Bishop threw for 306 yards and 2 touchdowns, and ran for 140 yards and two more scores as the Wildcats finally broke through against the Huskers.  Kansas State beat Nebraska for the first time since 1968 and the first time in Manhattan since 1959.

at #19 Missouri

Kansas State visited Columbia with their national title hopes very much alive and were able to squeak out a 31–25 victory.  Second team All-American kicker Martin Gramatica uncharacteristically missed two field goals and punt returner David Allen nearly returned his seventh career punt return for a touchdown.  School rushing career record Eric Hickson missed the game with a high ankle sprain and was replaced by David Allen and Frank Murphy in the backfield.  The Wildcats won their sixth consecutive game over the Tigers (they would eventually extend the streak to 13 games).

Texas A&M (Big 12 Championship)

K-State lost in devastating fashion in double overtime and lost their chance at playing in the National Championship.

Purdue (Alamo Bowl)

Kansas State had 125 yards in penalties, 7 turnovers, and allowed the Boilermakers to drive 80 yards in only 54 seconds for the game-winning touchdown.

Rankings

Postseason Awards
Bill Snyder – Named Big 12 Coach of the Year, Paul "Bear" Bryant Award, Walter Camp Coach of the Year, AP Coach of the Year, Bobby Dodd Coach of the Year Award
Michael Bishop – Davey O'Brien Award, Heisman Trophy runner-up, All-American, First-Team All-Big 12
Jeff Kelly – Consensus All-American, First-Team All-Big 12
Martín Gramática – Consensus All-American, First-Team All-Big 12
David Allen – Consensus All-American, First-Team All-Big 12
Ryan Young – First-Team All-Big 12
Darnell McDonald – First-Team All-Big 12
Darren Howard – First-Team All-Big 12
Jarrod Cooper – First-Team All-Big 12

Players in the 1999 NFL Draft

References

Kansas State
Kansas State Wildcats football seasons
Kansas State Wildcats football